Elling Øvergård (6 May 1947 – 17 March 1999) was a Norwegian sports shooter. He competed in three events at the 1968 Summer Olympics.

References

External links
 

1947 births
1999 deaths
Norwegian male sport shooters
Olympic shooters of Norway
Shooters at the 1968 Summer Olympics
People from Vestre Toten
Sportspeople from Innlandet
20th-century Norwegian people